Just Call Me Stupid is a children's novel by Tom Birdseye, published in 1993.

Plot
Patrick is traumatized since his father would keep on calling him stupid and locking him in a closet. This led him to have troubles reading by fifth grade, leading his teachers and school bullies to also call him stupid. This is about to change thanks to a kind teacher, and the encounter of Celina, a neighbor and a classmate, whom he met once he was playing chess by himself in the park. Celine starts reading to Patrick and asks him to tell her a story that she secretly records, submits to a contest behind his back, and wins a trophy. Patrick gets furious, but this opens the path for Patrick to face his fear of being dumb and unlocks his pleasure for reading.

References

1993 American novels
American children's novels
1993 children's books